Aneurin Owen (born 19 October 2000) is a Welsh rugby union player, currently playing for Pro14 side Dragons. His preferred position is centre.

Dragons
Owen was named in the Dragons first-team squad for the 2020–21 Pro14 season. He made his Dragons debut in Round 2 of the 2020–21 European Rugby Champions Cup against Bordeaux Bègles.

References

External links
itsrugby.co.uk Profile

2000 births
Living people
Rugby union players from Newport, Wales
Welsh rugby union players
Dragons RFC players
Rugby union centres